The Worshipful Company of Clothworkers was incorporated by Royal Charter in 1528, formed by the amalgamation of its two predecessor companies, the Fullers (incorporated 1480) and the Shearmen (incorporated 1508). It succeeded to the position of the Shearmen's Company and thus ranks twelfth in the order of precedence of Livery Companies of the City of London.

The original craft of the Clothworkers was the finishing of woven woollen cloth: fulling it to mat the fibres and remove the grease, drying it on tenter frames raising the nap with teasels (Dipsacus) and shearing it to a uniform finish. The Ordinances of The Clothworkers' Company, first issued in 1532 and signed by Sir Thomas More, sought to regulate clothworking, to maintain standards and to protect approved practices.

From the later Middle Ages, cloth production gradually moved away from London, a situation exacerbated by the Great Fire of London and the Industrial Revolution of the 18th and 19th centuries. The charitable role of the Clothworkers' company nevertheless continued, supported by generous gifts of money and property by members and benefactors.

Nowadays, the company's main role is in the charitable sphere, through the Clothworkers' Foundation, an independent charity.  Through its grants, the Foundation seeks to improve the quality of life, particularly for people and communities that face disadvantage. The company generates some of its income by renting out the hall on a private hire basis for events.

Both the company and the foundation operate from Clothworkers' Hall, in Dunster Court, between Mincing Lane and Mark Lane in the City of London. The site was conveyed to a group of Shearmen in 1456 and the present building, completed in 1958, is the sixth on the site. Its immediate predecessor, designed by Samuel Angell and opened in 1860, was destroyed in 1941.

Famous members of the Worshipful Company of Clothworkers included King James I, Samuel Pepys, Prince Albert of Saxe-Coburg and Gotha, Baroness Burdett-Coutts, George Peabody, Sydney Waterlow, Edward VII, Lord Kelvin, Viscount Slim, Robert Menzies and the Duke of Kent.

References

External links
 The Clothworkers' Company
 ROLLCO

Clothworkers
1528 establishments in England